Robert Party (1924–2011) was a French actor.

Selected filmography
 The New Adventures of Vidocq (1971, TV series)

External links
 

1924 births
2011 deaths
French male film actors
French male television actors
French male stage actors
Male actors from Marseille